Richland Presbyterian Church is a historic Presbyterian church located near Gadsden, Richland County, South Carolina. It was built in 1840 and is a one-story, rectangular meeting house form frame church with an octagonal entrance tower. The building remained in use until 1922.

It was added to the National Register of Historic Places in 1986.

References

Presbyterian churches in South Carolina
Churches on the National Register of Historic Places in South Carolina
Churches completed in 1883
19th-century Presbyterian church buildings in the United States
Churches in Richland County, South Carolina
National Register of Historic Places in Richland County, South Carolina